"She Is His Only Need" is a song written by Dave Loggins, and performed by American country music artist Wynonna. It was Wynonna's first solo single, after spending nine years alongside her mother, Naomi Judd, as The Judds.  It was released in January 1992 as the first single from Wynonna's self-titled debut album.  The song was her first Number One hit on the Billboard Hot Country Singles & Tracks (now Hot Country Songs) charts.

Content
The song is a country pop ballad that chronicles the life of two characters. The first is a loner, named Billy, who is reluctant to leave southern Arizona, until he meets the song's other character, a woman named Bonnie. Throughout the first verse, he befriends Bonnie and eventually marries her. According to the chorus, his love for her drives him to work overtime in order to buy her things that he knew she wanted because "she is his only need". The second verse follows their marriage as they have two children who grow up and move away from home. Even as the couple become elderly, the love continues to drive him to go out of his way to buy her things that he has heard her mention she wanted.

Promotion
Wynonna promoted "She Is His Only Need" by releasing a compact disc which consisted of her introducing herself and asking radio to play the single. The CD's announcement ended with "And my only need is for y'all to play it. Because I have a mom to support. So thanks." This was a reference to her mother, Naomi Judd, who had retired due to a bout of hepatitis.

Personnel
The following musicians performed on this track:
Eddie Bayers – drums
Wynonna Judd – lead and background vocals
Dave Loggins – background vocals
Steve Nathan – keyboards
Don Potter – acoustic guitar
Judy Rodman – background vocals
Matt Rollings – keyboards 
Steuart Smith – electric guitar
Willie Weeks – bass guitar

Chart performance

Year-end charts

References

1992 debut singles
1992 songs
Wynonna Judd songs
Song recordings produced by Tony Brown (record producer)
Songs written by Dave Loggins
MCA Records singles
Curb Records singles